Mohammad Qasem (also Romanized as Moḩammad Qāsem; also known as Deh-e Moḩammad Qāsem) is a village in Jahanabad Rural District, in the Central District of Hirmand County, Sistan and Baluchestan Province, Iran. At the 2006 census, its population was 678, in 108 families.

References 

Populated places in Hirmand County